, located in Kelsterbach, Germany, is the German trade union for flight attendants. It represents all German flight attendants with German airlines.

External links
Kabine Klar website

Transport trade unions in Germany
Flight attendants' trade unions
Aviation organisations based in Germany